Dragijevica is a village located in Osečina Municipality, Kolubara District, Serbia.

References

Suburbs of Belgrade